No Good Deed is a 2014 American psychological thriller film directed by Sam Miller and written by Aimée Lagos. The film stars Idris Elba, Taraji P. Henson, Leslie Bibb, Kate del Castillo, and Henry Simmons. The film was released on September 12, 2014.

Despite negative critical reception, the film was a box office success and received two Image Award nominations, winning one for Taraji P. Henson's performance.

Plot
Colin Evans has been sentenced to prison for 15 years for manslaughter in the state of Tennessee. He is eligible for parole after five years, and during his parole hearing, Colin claims he is a changed man and has been rehabilitated; but the parole board denies his release, claiming that he is not trustworthy enough, and is sent back to prison for another five years until the next hearing. On the way back to prison, Colin kills the correctional officers transporting him and escapes with the van.

In Atlanta, Terri Granger is a stay-at-home mother. Her best friend Meg suggests a "girls' night" to cheer Terri up after her husband Jeffrey abruptly leaves for a family visit, as she knows that Terri's relationship with Jeffrey has been suffering.

Colin stalks his ex-fiancée Alexis and witnesses her meeting another man at an outdoor cafe. Colin follows her home where they argue violently, resulting in him murdering Alexis. Later that day, Colin loses control of his car and crashes into a tree during a storm. Walking down the road, he notices Terri's house. He asks her if he can use her phone to call for a tow truck. Apprehensive at first, she decides to help him, and eventually invites him inside. Meg later arrives and is shocked by Colin's presence.

When Terri leaves momentarily to comfort her baby, Meg and Colin are left alone; Colin excuses himself for a cigarette break, but Meg follows him. Colin suggests that he is having an affair with Terri, but Meg does not believe him. As she begins to call out to Terri, Colin quickly grabs a shovel and bashes Meg in the head with it, killing her.

As Terri returns, Colin tells her that Meg left, but Terri is suspicious, especially when she sees Meg's umbrella in the stand. Alarmed, she rushes to the kitchen to call the police, only to find out that Colin has disconnected all the wires and hidden all of her knives. Terri rushes into her daughter Ryan's bedroom to find Colin playing with her. As they exit the bedroom, Terri hits him with a fire extinguisher, making him fall down the stairs; she runs to get her children, but Colin has recovered. He tells her to put the children back in their rooms and reveals a gun. In a brief moment where she strikes him unconscious, she manages to flee to her home office and dials 911 for help. Colin recovers and discovers her in the office. She begs him to leave, explaining to him that the police are coming and that his blood is all over her kitchen (because she managed to cut him earlier). Colin forces her to take the children into her vehicle and drive away with him. While walking out of the garage, Terri sees Meg's dead body on the floor.
 
Colin makes Terri drive to Alexis' house, and introduces Terri to his dead ex-fiancée. The high winds from the storm cause Terri's car alarm to activate; worried that the noise will attract attention, Colin ties her up while he goes to check on the car. Terri answers Alexis' phone as it starts to ring and is surprised to hear Jeffrey, who is calling Alexis to find out why she has not arrived at the hotel for a rendezvous with him. Terri realizes that he was not out of town with his father and has been having an affair with Alexis. She also realizes that her encounter with Colin was not coincidental as he wants revenge on Jeffrey because of his affair with Alexis. Terri tells her husband the truth and has him call 911. She misleads Colin into thinking that she and her children have escaped. When Colin finds her, she attacks him, grabbing his gun and shooting him until he falls out of a window.

The police arrive with Jeffrey, he apologizes to Terri about the affair but she punches him in the face, and leaves him afterward. Sometime later, a much more confident Terri returns to her career and has moved into a new house with her children.

Cast 
 Idris Elba as Colin Evans
 Taraji P. Henson as Terri Granger
 Leslie Bibb as Meg, Terri's friend
 Kate del Castillo as Alexis, Colin's ex-fiancee
 Henry Simmons as Jeffrey Granger, Terri's husband
 Mark Smith as EMT
 Wilbur Fitzgerald as Dr. Ross
 Mirage Moonschein as Ryan Granger, Terri and Jeffrey's daughter

Production 
Filming of No Good Deed began in April 2012 in Atlanta, Georgia.

Release 
No Good Deed was initially set to be released on October 18, 2013. In January 2013, Screen Gems announced the film would be moved to open on January 17, 2014, at the beginning of the MLK Holiday weekend. This date conflicted with another Will Packer-produced film, Ride Along, a Universal Pictures release that stars Ice Cube and Kevin Hart. For this reason, in April 2013, the studio pushed back No Good Deeds release date for a second time to April 25, 2014. Yet again, in early October 2013 (and giving no specific reason), Screen Gems for a third time pushed backed the release date of the film to September 12, 2014. Sony Pictures Releasing debuted the first official trailer for the film on June 12, 2014. No Good Deed was released on Blu-ray and DVD on January 6, 2015.

Box office
No Good Deed was released on Friday, September 12, 2014. The film was #1 at the domestic box office over the 3-day weekend, grossing $24,250,283 at 2,175 North American theaters ($11,150 per theater average). The film was producer Will Packer's third #1 film of 2014, following Ride Along and Think Like a Man Too. No Good Deed grossed $54,323,210 worldwide.

Reception
No Good Deed has received generally negative reviews from critics. Rotten Tomatoes gives the film a rating of 12% based on reviews from 57 critics. The site's consensus reads, "Dull, derivative, and generally uninspired, No Good Deed wastes its stars' talents -- and the audience's time." Metacritic gives the film a weighted average score of 26 out of 100 based on reviews from 17 critics.

The audience for No Good Deed was 60 percent female, 59 percent over the age of 30. Filmgoers gave the movie a "B+" CinemaScore.

Soundtrack 

Screen Gems and Madison Gate Records released the soundtrack to the film No Good Deed digitally and physically on September 9, 2014. The 15-track album contains the film's original score composed by Paul Haslinger.

"No Good Deed offered a great opportunity to re-explore a style of score I had first developed for the film Vacancy; music designed to enhance psychological qualities in the telling of a story, in this case, a rather dark one. My personal preference for this kind of approach is to mix classic film noir elements with music, sound-design elements; sometimes alternating, sometimes superimposing them. The goal ultimately was to connect the headspace of the characters with that of the audience, to make the audience feel the threads of the story as they watch it unfold. Working off great performances by Idris Elba and Taraji P. Henson, this was a unique and rewarding project to be involved with!" - Paul Haslinger.

See also 

 List of films featuring home invasions

References

External links 
 
 
 

2014 films
2014 psychological thriller films
American psychological thriller films
African-American films
Films set in Atlanta
Home invasions in film
American films about revenge
Films produced by Will Packer
Screen Gems films
Will Packer Productions films
Films scored by Paul Haslinger
2010s English-language films
Films directed by Sam Miller
2010s American films